is the third studio album by the Japanese girl band Princess Princess, released on November 21, 1988, by CBS Sony. It features the single "Get Crazy!" and the song "M", which was released as the B-side of the band's first No. 1 hit "Diamonds".

The album peaked at No. 2 on Oricon's albums chart.

Track listing 
All music is arranged by Princess Princess.

Charts

References

External links
 
 
 

Princess Princess (band) albums
1988 albums
Sony Music Entertainment Japan albums
Japanese-language albums